Canterbury East railway station is on the Dover branch of the Chatham Main Line in England, and is one of two stations serving the city of Canterbury, Kent.

The station and all trains that serve the station are operated by Southeastern.

Location
All serving trains are operated by Southeastern.

Both stations are located due west of Canterbury’s city centre; in fact, despite their names, the two stations lie on the same line of longitude.

History
The station and its line were built by the London, Chatham & Dover Railway and opened on 9 July 1860 as Canterbury. To avoid confusion with the older station also called Canterbury, built by the South Eastern Railway, it was renamed to Canterbury East on 1 July 1889 while the SER station was renamed .

The semaphore signals at the station were replaced with coloured lights in December 2011.  The elevated signal box remains but is no longer in use, with signalling on the line operated from a control room at Gillingham. The signal box was given Grade II listed building status in 2013.

Canterbury East's ticket barriers were removed in early 2011, as they were the only ones of the kind in the country and spare parts were no longer easy to obtain. Work began to install a new gate-line in October 2016. Coventry and Earlsfield are the only other stations to lose their ticket barriers.

The station has a ticket office, an electronic ticket machine, a cafe and toilets.  A footbridge and lifts were opened in 2021.

Services
All services at Canterbury East are operated by Southeastern using  EMUs.

The typical off-peak service in trains per hour is:
 1 tph to  via 
 1 tph to 

Gallery

References
Citations

Sources

External links

Canterbury
Railway stations in Kent
DfT Category C1 stations
Former London, Chatham and Dover Railway stations
Railway stations in Great Britain opened in 1860
Railway stations served by Southeastern